9069 Hovland, provisional designation , is a stony binary Hungaria asteroid from the inner regions of the asteroid belt, approximately 3 kilometers in diameter.

It was discovered on 16 July 1993, by American astronomer Eleanor Helin at the Palomar Observatory in California, United States, and later named for American JPL engineer Larry Hovland.

Orbit and classification 

The bright E-type asteroid is a member of the Hungaria family, which form the innermost dense concentration of asteroids in the Solar System. Hovland orbits the Sun in the inner main-belt at a distance of 1.7–2.1 AU once every 2 years and 8 months (966 days). Its orbit has an eccentricity of 0.12 and an inclination of 20° with respect to the ecliptic.

Rotation period 

Several rotational lightcurves of Hovland were obtained from photometric observations. These lightcurves gave a well-defined rotation period of 4.216 to 4.217 hours and a low brightness variation between 0.008 and 0.011 in magnitude, indicating a nearly spheroidal shape.

Diameter and albedo 

According to the space-based Spitzer Space Telescope, Hovland has a high albedo of 0.373 and a diameter of 2.9 kilometers, while the Collaborative Asteroid Lightcurve Link assumes a standard albedo for members of the Hungaria family of 0.30, and calculates a diameter of 3.5 kilometers.

Moon 

In 2004, the U.S Palmer Divide Observatory, Colorado, reported the discovery of an asteroid moon making the asteroid a binary system. The moon's orbital period has since been measured to take 30.292, 30.34 and 30.35 hours, respectively, for a full orbit around its primary.

Naming 

This minor planet was named in honor of JPL engineer Larry E. Hovland (b. 1947), who oversees the electronics of the Raman spectrometer and the Mars 2005 optical navigation camera. He helped the discoverer to transition from photographic to electronic detection methods. The approved naming citation was published by the Minor Planet Center on 9 May 2001.

Notes

References

External links 
 Lightcurve plot of 9069 Hovland, Palmer Divide Observatory, B. D. Warner (2012)
 Asteroids with Satellites, Robert Johnston, johnstonsarchive.net
 Asteroid Lightcurve Database (LCDB), query form (info )
 Dictionary of Minor Planet Names, Google books
 Asteroids and comets rotation curves, CdR – Observatoire de Genève, Raoul Behrend
 Discovery Circumstances: Numbered Minor Planets (5001)-(10000) – Minor Planet Center
 
 

Hungaria asteroids
Hovland
Hovland
Binary asteroids
19930716